Wolfgang Heribert Kämmerer von Worms Freiherr von Dalberg (born 18 November 1750 in Worms-Herrnsheim, died 27 September 1806 in Mannheim) was a courtier and statesman of Baden, who served as Minister of State and Grand Master of the Household. He was also the first general administrator of the Mannheim National Theatre.

He was a member of the prominent House of Dalberg and brother of Karl Theodor von Dalberg, the Arch-Chancellor of the Holy Roman Empire and Marianne von der Leyen, regent of the County of Hohengeroldseck. He was the father of Emmerich Joseph von Dalberg, who became a French diplomat and was granted the French title of duc de Dalberg (Duke of Dalberg) in 1810.

References 

18th-century German politicians
1750 births
1806 deaths
18th-century theatre managers